Psychogenic pain is physical pain that is caused, increased, or prolonged by mental, emotional, or behavioral factors, without evidence of physical injury or illness.

Headache, back pain, or stomach pain are some of the most common types of psychogenic pain. It is commonly accompanied by social rejection, broken heart, grief, lovesickness, regret, or other such emotional events. This pain can also be caused by psychological factors such as anxiety and depression, factors which can affect the onset and severity of pain experienced.

Sufferers are often stigmatized, because both medical professionals and the general public tend to think that pain from psychological source is not "real".

The International Association for the Study of Pain defines pain as "an unpleasant sensory and emotional experience associated with actual or potential tissue damage, or described in terms of such damage" (emphasis added). In the note accompanying that definition, the following can be found about pain that happens for psychological reasons: 
Many people report pain in the absence of tissue damage or any likely pathophysiological cause; usually this happens for psychological reasons. There is usually no way to distinguish their experience from that due to tissue damage if we take the subjective report. If they regard their experience as pain and if they report it in the same ways as pain caused by tissue damage, it should be accepted as pain.

Medicine refers also to psychogenic pain or psychalgia as a form of chronic pain under the name of persistent somatoform pain disorder or functional pain syndrome. Causes may be linked to stress, unexpressed emotional conflicts, psychosocial problems, or various mental disorders. Some specialists believe that psychogenic chronic pain exists as a protective distraction to keep dangerous repressed emotions such as anger or rage unconscious.

It remains controversial, however, that chronic pain might arise purely from emotional causes.

Diagnosis 
There is no specific way of testing for psychogenic pain making it difficult to assess. There are many different criteria and factors considered for psychogenic pain diagnosis.

 Presence of pain
 Intense pain or suffering
 Impairment of everyday functions
 Symptoms ruled as unintentional
 Symptoms do not fit criteria for other potential somatic or mental disorders

Treatment 
For many patients a combination of psychotherapy and pharmacotherapy can help to alleviate or treat the symptoms of psychogenic pain. These treatments can include Cognitive behavioral therapy, acceptance and commitment therapy, or forms commonly used for chronic pain treatments. Interventional techniques can also be used. Treatments can address underlying feelings and emotion conflicts that can lead to psychogenic pain as well as other potential causes of dysfunction with behavior, affect, and coping that can be seen in patients. In cases where therapy and medication do not show results, some may consider psycho/neurosurgeries in treating psychogenic pain. These surgeries target portions of the brain associated with mood disorders and pain. Deep Brain Stimulation (DBS) can also be used through stimulating parts of the brain related to behavior and emotion to relieve the psychological cause of the pain.

See also
Pain disorder
Psychogenic disease
Psychological trauma
Psychoneuroimmunology
Psychosomatic medicine
Tension myositis syndrome

References

External links 

Pain
Symptoms and signs of mental disorders